Erygia sigillata is a species of moth in the family Erebidae found in Himachal Pradesh, Northern India. The moth was officially recognized and classified in 1892.

References

Moths described in 1889
Erygia
Moths of Asia